Cora palaeotropica is a species of basidiolichen in the family Hygrophoraceae. Found in Sri Lanka, it was formally described as a new species in 2016 by Gothamie Weerakoon, André Aptroot, and Robert Lücking. The specific epithet palaeotropica refers to its palaeotropical distribution, which is unique in the genus Cora. It is only known from its type locality in the Sinharaja Forest Reserve, a biodiversity hotspot in the Southern Province.

Description

Unusually for genus Cora, Cora palaeotropica does not make a distinct cortex, instead it has short, perpendicular hyphae with rounded edges that emerge from the photobiont layer. It grows on the soil and its detritus, or in association with bryophytes.

References

palaeotropica
Lichen species
Lichens described in 2016
Lichens of Sri Lanka
Taxa named by André Aptroot
Taxa named by Robert Lücking
Taxa named by Gothamie Weerakoon
Basidiolichens